Martin J. Sweeney (born July 2, 1963) is an American politician of the Democratic Party in Cleveland, Ohio. He was elected a member of the Ohio State legislature in 2014. Previously he served as the majority leader of Cleveland City Council, representing Ward 20.

He was elected council president in November 2005, when then-president Frank G. Jackson was elected mayor of Cleveland.  He assumed office as council president on January 2, 2006. Sweeney graduated from Saint Ignatius High School on Cleveland's West Side in 1981.  Sweeney's father is retired Cleveland Municipal Court judge Gerald Francis Sweeney.

In 2014, Sweeney decided to run for the Ohio House of Representatives. After winning a three-way primary, he won the general election over Republican 62%-38%.

References

1963 births
Living people
Cleveland City Council members
Saint Ignatius High School (Cleveland) alumni
21st-century American politicians
Democratic Party members of the Ohio House of Representatives
Cuyahoga County Council members